Nanyuki is a Market town in Laikipia County  of Kenya lying northwest of Mount Kenya along the A2 road and at the terminus of the branch railway from Nairobi. The name is derived from Enyaanyukie Maasai word for resemblance.

It is situated just north of the Equator (0° 01' North). In 1907, British immigrants settled in Nanyuki, some of whose descendants still live in and around the town. Nanyuki is currently the main airfield (airbase) of the Kenya Air Force. The British Army Training Unit Kenya (BATUK), has a base at Nyati Barracks. It conducts infantry exercises in Laikipia and on Kenyan Ministry of Defense land at Archer's Post.

History 
Maasai herders found red ochre in Nanyuki, the ground resembled roan coated cattle. The town saw British immigrants settle there during the early days of colonial Kenya in 1907. Some of their descendants still live in or around the town. Major Digby Tatham-Warter, a British Army officer famed for carrying an umbrella into battle, moved to Nanyuki after the war and lived on his farm until his death in 1993. During the Mau Mau Uprising, Digby raised a volunteer mounted police force at his own expense and led them against the Mau Mau.
  The town is noted for small- and large-scale farms, ranches and pastoral lands, and wildlife conservancies. It is also the base for people seeking to climb Mount Kenya. Nanyuki sits almost directly on the Equator.

Climate 
Nanyuki is relatively cool year-round, experiences weakly trimodal rainfall, with a distinct dry season in January and February.

Economy and overview 

Nanyuki municipality had an urban population of 49,233 in 2009. Most members of the population earn their money through trade.  Shops in the town supply many farms, ranches and game parks in a wide circle, as well as the town's residents. Originally, most shops were owned by Indians, who still form a sizable part of the population.  Climbers and backpackers visit Nanyuki on their way to or from Mount Kenya along the Sirimon and Naro Moru routes and many other tourists pass through the town.  Nanyuki has many hotels, of which Mount Kenya Safari Club and Sportsman's Arms Hotel are the most prominent. Other hotels include Sport's Club, Le Rustique, Kongoni Camp, Mount Kenya Paradise Hotel and Joskaki Hotel. South of Nanyuki, the Bantu lodge offers outdoor activities, including forest walks. The nearby “Trout Tree Restaurant” offers trout prepared in various ways from its own trout farm.  Another notable restaurant is "Barneys" located at Nanyuki Civil Airfield, once the location of the No. 1340 Flight RAF, which flew Harvards during the Mau Mau Uprising.

There is little large-scale industry in Nanyuki.  The Mount Kenya Textile (Mountex) Mills went bankrupt in 1978, was reopened briefly under new management, but eventually eventually closed.  There have been a number of sawmills in Nanyuki. However, with the almost total ban on tree felling on Mount Kenya (sometimes indifferently enforced), these either closed down or are now eking out a difficult existence. Recently, large horticultural operations have come to the Nanyuki area, including Likii flower farm, Traco farm, Kongoni farm and several others along Nanyuki- Timau road. The revived railway transport between Nanyuki and Nairobi has increased trade in the  town. Main retail centers are Cieni, Cedar Mall and Quick Mart.

A city park lies in the centre of the town and two rivers, the Nanyuki and LikiI Rivers, pass through it. The Equator passes through the southern part of Nanyuki. One crosses it when approaching Nanyuki on the A2 from the south. This spot is popular with tourists who have themselves photographed there. Some people are usually at hand to show them the supposed effect of the Coriolis force, which they say makes draining water swirl clockwise or anticlockwise depending on whether one is on the northern or southern hemisphere, though as noted in the article about the Coriolis force, the effect is detectable only in the laboratory and the "demonstrations" at the Equator are merely engaging diversions.

Tourism 
There are regular flights operated by Air Kenya, Safarilink and Fly SAX, which is convenient for businessmen and tourists. The town is also served by a paved road from Nairobi, and northward to northern Kenya. Tourists can visit a number of parks and reserves in the vicinity of Nanyuki, the most obvious one being Mount Kenya National Park. The Mount Kenya Wildlife Conservancy and the Fairmont Mount Kenya Safari Club host large numbers of tourists seeking a luxury safari experience. The hotel has 120 luxury rooms with views of Mount Kenya alongside the Mount Kenya Wildlife Conservancy which together with William Holden Wildlife Foundation aims to breed and reintroduce the endangered bongo back into Mount Kenya. Others are Ol Pejeta Conservancy,  and further afield Lewa Wildlife Conservancy, Aberdare National Park, Samburu National Reserve and Shaba National Reserve.

Nanyuki has some of the cleanest water in Kenya because the source originates from Mt. Kenya. The entire water system is gravity fed, from the supply to the sewer system.

Education 
Academic institutions in Nanyuki include Nanyuki High School, Moi Equator Girls' High School, St Christopher's School (formerly the Beehive School), Braeburn International School Nanyuki, Nanyuki Primary School, Mary Immaculate Primary School, Baraka School, Brickwoods School, St. Jude Nturukuma secondary, Loise Girls high school, and others.

Images

See also 
 Nanyuki Airport
 Railway stations in Kenya
 Transport in Kenya

References

External links 

 Lily Pond Arts Centre - Nanyuki

Populated places in Laikipia County